Shenzhen BYD New Energy Co., Ltd., trading as Denza, is an automobile manufacturing company headquartered in Shenzhen, China, specialising in luxury electric cars and an equally owned joint venture between BYD and the Mercedes-Benz Group. The car was initially put on sale in selected Chinese cities only. In December 2021 it was announced the Daimler will reduce its share to 10% and BYD will hold 90%.

Name
An invented name from the Chinese Tengshi, Denza roughly translates to "rising power and momentum". Alternative translations include "wind power" or "winding circumstances".

History

On 1 March 2010, BYD Auto and Daimler AG signed a memorandum of understanding for the joint development of electric vehicles. That initial link-up led to the creation of a new, equal-ownership legal entity, Shenzhen BYD Daimler New Technology Co., Ltd., which was formally established on 27 May 2010 and received a business license from the Chinese state in March 2011. Its brand name, Denza, debuted in March 2012, and a new energy vehicle (NEV) concept car was first shown in April 2012 at the Auto China motor show in Beijing. It was expected that this product would be offered as a luxury car.

While its initial product was set to be launched in Beijing, Shanghai, and Shenzhen in September 2014, in June of that year the launch date was pushed back to late 2014, and the car debuted in December of that year.

Operations
In 2013, Denza was constructing its assembly plant in Pingshan, Shenzhen, which was set to have an annual capacity of 40,000 vehicles.

Government subsidies
Successful sales may depend on subsidies provided by the Chinese government. The chairman of the Chinese co-owner of Denza expressed his hope that these would be in place by mid-2013, and many of the press releases posted on the Denza website concern subsidies. Prior electric car grants were in effect for only two years starting in 2010, but in September 2013 a scheme providing cash payments to buyers of all-electric and hybrid vehicles was established.

When it was launched in December 2014, purchasers of the car qualified for a RMB 78,000 subsidy and while the total subsidy on offer depends on location of purchase, no more than RMB 120,000 can be deducted. Subsidies also increase demand for the car in other ways, too, and as of 2014 purchasers were exempted from Beijing's license plate lottery and qualified for free plates in Shanghai and Shenzhen.

Models and products

Current
Denza D9
Denza N7
Denza N8

Discontinued
Denza EV/500 (2014–2019)
Denza X (2019–2021)

Concept cars
 Denza EV Concept (2012)
 Denza Inception (2022)

Dealerships
As of December 2014, Denza boasted three dealerships: one each in Beijing, Shanghai, and Shenzhen. The company aims to put the car on sale in Guangzhou, Hangzhou, and Tianjin soon.

References

External links
 

Car manufacturers of China
Electric vehicle manufacturers of China
Vehicle manufacturing companies established in 2010
Chinese companies established in 2010
Manufacturing companies based in Shenzhen
Chinese brands
Luxury motor vehicle manufacturers
BYD Auto
Mercedes-Benz Group joint ventures
Chinese-foreign joint-venture companies